The Cremators is a 1972 science fiction horror film. It was one of the first movies from special effects expert Doug Berwick.

Plot
An alien life form that is a huge ball of living matter invades Earth, and replenishes itself by absorbing people.

See also
 List of American films of 1972
 The Cremator; World War II Czechoslovakian conscience film; Turner Classic Movies; 07/08/2019

References

External links

1970s exploitation films
1972 horror films
1972 films
1970s science fiction horror films
New World Pictures films
Films based on science fiction short stories
American science fiction horror films
Films scored by Albert Glasser
1970s English-language films
1970s American films